Hafkenscheid is a family name that originated in the 17th century. Hafkenscheid comes from the words "Hafke" (Habicht, goshawk) and "Scheid" (Flurgrenze, borderline between estates). The family has taken its name from the former Havkenscheid castle in the hamlet of the same name near Bochum, Westphalia. In 1340, vassal of this castle is Deitrich von Havekenscede, ancestor of a family that has held it in fee until the seventeenth century. 

The Hafkenscheid family coat of arms depicts a hawk on top of a hill. The official description (in Dutch): "Schild: in goud op een heuvel van sinopel staande een havik van natuurlijke kleur, met opgetrokken rechterpoot, de vleugels in vlucht. Helmwrong dekkleden en vlucht: van goud en sinopel".

More information and the genealogical database of the family can be found at www.hafkenscheid.com.

Surnames